The Nepal Mathematical Society (NMS), was founded (formally) in January, 1979 (Nepali :बिक्रम सम्बत २०३५ माघ ५), by enthusiastic Nepalese mathematicians of that time, with the aim of enhancing the academic excellency in studying, teaching, research and applications of Mathematics.

Overview
The Nepal Mathematical Society is an association of professional mathematicians dedicated for promotion of mathematical sciences in the country. The society annually published various publications, and held conferences and talk programs at local and national level. The first president the Nepal Mathematical Society is Prof. Dhup Ratna Bajracharya.

History
Establishment of an Institute for enhancing mathematical research and education through sound activities was realized in 2019 B.S. The informal discussion happened between and among the most enthusiastic mathematicians and students of the master's degree program in a picnic program in 2019 B.S. Primarily those parental figures of the institution were Prof. Ashutosh Ganguly, Prof. Krishna Murari Saxena, Prof. Govinda Dev Pant, Prof. Keshav Dev Bhattarai, Prof. Dhup Ratna Bajracharya including the students Ram Man Shrestha, Shankar Raj Pant. The Society attained its legal status in 2035/10/05 B.S.

Objectives
The Nepal Mathematical Society aims:
 To enhance the academic excellency in studying, teaching, research and applications in mathematics.
 To preserve and promote the professional ethics and rights and welfare of teachers and researchers of mathematics.
 To work continuously for promoting mathematics maintaining good relations with the national and international educational and academics.

Members and membership
Nepal Mathematical Society consists of more than 1000 life members around the globe as of data of 2021. The society offers two kinds of memberships in general: General membership and life membership. The general membership is to be renewed every year by paying a nominal membership fee, and the life membership can be obtained by paying the fee designated for life membership. To be eligible for the NMS membership, one has to hold a minimum of a master's degree in mathematical sciences  either from Central Department of Mathematics TU or from some other universities  recognized by Tribhuvan University.

Publications
The Nepal Mathematical Society publishes the Journal of Nepal Mathematical Society and the Nepal Mathematical Society Newsletter, the society's official newsletter.

Activities
The Nepal Mathematical Society organizes seminars, conferences, trainings every year to promote the studies, teaching and research in mathematics.

Association
The Nepal Mathematical Society has a reciprocity relationship with American Mathematical Society.

See also
List of Mathematical Societies
Mathematics in Nepal
Association of Nepalese Mathematicians in America

References

External links

A mathematical poetry book from Nepal 
A History of Mathematical Sciences in Nepal
A 1933 Nepali Mathematics and Astrology Book Śiśubodha Taraṅgiṇī II Translation and Commentary on Mathematics Chapters
Description of Old Nepali mathematics book and their potential in improving current day teaching and learning

1979 establishments in Nepal
Organizations established in 1979
Mathematical societies
Educational organisations based in Nepal
Non-profit organisations based in Nepal
Science and technology in Nepal